The Ghost was a punk rock band from Chicago, with its roots based in the San Francisco Bay Area, California. Members were Brian Moss (Wunder Years, Hanalei, Ole Hole, Great Apes), Randall Bleichner, Jordan Schalich, Shane Stevens, and Paul Lask. From 2001 to 2005 The Ghost toured with bands such as Rival Schools, Thursday, Communique, The Exit, The Cost, Twelve Hour Turn and Small Brown Bike.

Signed to Some Records, The Ghost released two full-length albums. This Is a Hospital, recorded by Steve Albini, was met with favorable reviews. In 2005 This Pen Is a Weapon, recorded and produced by Brian Deck, was met with mixed reviews.

In December 2004 the band broke up, citing "arguments, shifting interests, consistently harsh tours, depression, and conflicting views".

Discography

Albums
 This Is a Hospital, Some Records, 2002
 This Pen Is a Weapon, Some Records, 2004
 This Is a Hospital re-release, Solidarity Recordings, 2009
400 clear green vinyl / 100 white vinyl / 100 black vinyl (only available at Reunion shows)

Splits
 The Ghost/Prosperity Wallet Split, Grey Flight Records, 2002
700 Black Vinyl / 300 White Vinyl

Compilations
 Living Tomorrow Today: A Benefit for Ty Cambra, Asianman Records, 2001
Track 18: Groundswell
 Oil: Chicago Punk Refind, Thick Records, 2002
Track 8: They Came To See You
 Metaphysics For Beginners, Redder Records, 2006
Track 11: Red Slippers, Red Wheels (Midwest Reprise)

References

External links
 The Ghost on Myspace
 The Ghost profile at Some Records
 

Punk rock groups from Illinois
Musical groups from Chicago